The 2015–16 North Dakota Fighting Hawks women's basketball team represents the University of North Dakota during the 2015–16 NCAA Division I women's basketball season. The Fighting Hawks, led by fourth year head coach Travis Brewster and play their home games at the Betty Engelstad Sioux Center. They were members of the Big Sky Conference. They finished the season 19–14, 13–5 in Big Sky play to finish in a 3 way tie for second place. They advanced to the semifinals of the Big Sky women's tournament where they lost to Idaho State. They were invited to the Women's Basketball Invitational where defeated New Mexico in the first round before losing in the quarterfinals to Big Sky member Weber State.

Roster

Schedule

|-
!colspan=9 style="background:#009E60; color:#000000;"| Exhibition

|-
!colspan=9 style="background:#009E60; color:#000000;"| Non-conference regular season

|-
!colspan=9 style="background:#009E60; color:#000000;"| Big Sky regular season

|-
!colspan=9 style="background:#009E60; color:#000000;"| Big Sky tournament

|-
!colspan=9 style="background:#009E60; color:#000000;"| WBI

See also
2015–16 North Dakota Fighting Hawks men's basketball team

References

North Dakota Fighting Hawks women's basketball seasons
North Dakota
North Dakota